Eilema proleucodes is a moth of the subfamily Arctiinae. It was described by Sergius G. Kiriakoff in 1958. It is found in Uganda.

References

 

proleucodes
Moths described in 1958